On My Mind may refer to:

 "On My Mind" (Cody Simpson song), 2011
 "On My Mind" (Diplo and Sidepiece song), 2019
 "On My Mind" (Disciples song), 2017
 "On My Mind" (Ellie Goulding song), 2015
 On My Mind, a 2015 EP by Bend Sinister
 "On My Mind", a song by Jeff Lynne's ELO from the 2015 album Alone in the Universe
 "On My Mind", a 2021 song by Mashd N Kutcher
 "On My Mind", a song by New Found Glory from the 2006 album Coming Home
 "On My Mind", a 2015 single by Don Diablo
 On My Mind (film), a 2021 short film

Other uses
 "(Baby I've Got You) On My Mind", a 2003 song by Powderfinger

See also
 Always on My Mind (disambiguation)
 In My Mind (disambiguation)
 My Mind (disambiguation)